Hoseyniyeh Rural District is a rural district (dehestan) in Alvar-e Garmsiri District, Andimeshk County, Khuzestan Province, Iran. At the 2006 census, its population was 5,120, in 1,040 families.  The rural district has 37 villages.

References 

Rural Districts of Khuzestan Province
Andimeshk County